Joseph Patrick Delaney (August 24, 1934 – July 12, 2005) was the second American Roman Catholic bishop of the Diocese of Fort Worth in the state of Texas.

Born in Fall River, Massachusetts, Delaney was ordained a priest for the Roman Catholic Diocese of Fall River on December 18, 1960. In 1971, he was incardinated into the Roman Catholic Diocese of Brownsville, Texas. On July 10, 1981, he was named bishop of the Roman Catholic Diocese of Fort Worth, Texas and was consecrated on September 13, 1981. He died while in office. Bishop-elect Kevin W. Vann was to be consecrated the next day and become coadjutor to Bishop Delaney; that ceremony went on as scheduled with Bishop Vann immediately becoming bishop of the diocese.

Notes 

1934 births
2005 deaths
People from Fall River, Massachusetts
21st-century Roman Catholic bishops in the United States
Catholics from Massachusetts
20th-century Roman Catholic bishops in the United States